Manhattan Is My Beat is a novel by crime writer Jeffery Deaver. Published in 1988, it is the first book in the Rune Trilogy.

Synopsis
Rune is a street-wise twenty-year-old, not long arrived in New York City, but she's already found herself a squat in an empty loft. She's also landed a job in a video store, Washington Square Video, that lets her pursue her interest in old movies; it's also where she meets Mr. Kelly, a lonely old man who rents the same tape over and over: a crime film based on a true story called Manhattan Is My Beat.

When Rune goes to visit him for a routine tape collection and finds him dead, the police suspect a robbery. However, Rune is convinced that the true answer to the mystery lies with the tape of Manhattan Is My Beat. This conviction draws her into a dangerous adventure against those who will stop at nothing to hide the truth and don't believe in Hollywood endings.

Other media
Manhattan Is My Beat has been optioned by Double B Productions.  The novel is being adapted by Double B Partners, John and Lisa Bishop.

References

1988 American novels
Novels by Jeffery Deaver
Rune Trilogy (novel series)
Novels set in New York City
Bantam Books books